William Malenfant (June 16, 1929 – December 16, 2016) was a Canadian politician. He served in the Legislative Assembly of New Brunswick from 1974 to 1982, as a Liberal member for the constituency of Memramcook. He was also a former mayor of Dieppe, New Brunswick.

Malenfant died on December 16, 2016 at the age of 87.

References

1929 births
2016 deaths
New Brunswick Liberal Association MLAs
People from Dieppe, New Brunswick